Charlotte d'Amboise (born May 11, 1964) is an American actress and dancer. She has played starring roles in musical theatre, and has been nominated for two Tony Awards and won the Los Angeles Ovation Awards for Best Leading Actress in a Musical for Chicago. She has also appeared in films.

Early life 
Charlotte d'Amboise was born in New York City, the daughter of Jacques d'Amboise, a ballet dancer and choreographer, and Carolyn George, a ballet dancer and photographer. She has a twin sister, Catherine. Her older brother is ballet dancer and choreographer Christopher d'Amboise.

Career

Musical theatre 
D'Amboise made her Broadway debut in the musical Cats in 1984 as Cassandra, where she met her future husband, performer Terrence Mann. She also performed in the role of Chris Hargensen in the ill-fated 1988 musical Carrie.  She frequently has played the role of Roxie Hart in Chicago, first heading the 1997 national tour and later joining the Broadway revival cast in 1999. She has appeared in productions of the musical every year since 2001.

In 2001, she replaced Karen Ziemba in Contact.

In early 2005, d'Amboise replaced Christina Applegate in the Boston leg of the pre-Broadway tour of the revival of Sweet Charity, as well as the first few weeks of previews on Broadway, following a foot injury sustained by Applegate that nearly cancelled the production. Once Applegate returned to the role in New York, d'Amboise remained as her standby while simultaneously performing the role of Roxie Hart in Chicago.

She appeared in the 2006 Broadway revival of A Chorus Line as Cassie, earning a Tony Award nomination.

She originated the role of Fastrada in the 2013 Broadway revival of Pippin, alongside her husband Terrence Mann, who played Charles.

Film 
Her film credits include The In Crowd (1988), American Blue Note (1989), Just Off the Coast (1992) and The Preacher's Wife (1996). She appears as herself in Every Little Step (2008), a documentary about the 2006 Broadway revival of A Chorus Line. In 2012, she appeared in Frances Ha, directed by Noah Baumbach.  On television, she has appeared in the Kennedy Center Honors (1989, 1995 and 2002), Law & Order (2001), One Life to Live (2009), and a videotaped performance of the Broadway musical Contact (2002). She has also appeared in several made-for-TV movies, including Alone in the Neon Jungle (1988), Lost in the Bermuda Triangle (1998) and Galyntine (2014).

Stage appearances

Awards and nominations

Personal life
She has been married to Terrence Mann since January 20, 1996. They have two daughters, Josephine (born in 2002) and Shelby (born in 2003). They both starred in musicals Cats, Jerome Robbins' Broadway and the 2013 Broadway revival of Pippin.

References

External links 
 
 
 Charlotte d'Amboise at Internet Off-Broadway Database
 Q&A: Charlotte d'Amboise
 Official Website for Carrie The Musical

American female dancers
Dancers from New York (state)
American musical theatre actresses
American film actresses
Actresses from New York City
Charlotte d'Amboise
1964 births
Living people
20th-century American actresses
American twins
21st-century American actresses
American people of Irish descent
American people of French-Canadian descent